The 2021–22 Maryland Terrapins men's basketball team represented the University of Maryland, College Park in the 2021–22 NCAA Division I men's basketball season. They were led by interim head coach Danny Manning. They played their home games at Xfinity Center in College Park, Maryland, as members of the Big Ten Conference. They finished the season 15–17, 7–13 in Big Ten play to finish in a three-way tie for 10th place. As the No. 10 seed in the Big Ten tournament, they lost to Michigan State in the second round.

On December 3, 2021, head coach Mark Turgeon and the school announced that the parties had mutually agreed that Turgeon would step down as head coach effective immediately. Manning, who had been hired as an assistant prior to the season, was named the interim head coach for the remainder of the season. On March 21, 2022, the school named Seton Hall head coach Kevin Willard the team's new head coach.

Previous season
In a season limited due to the ongoing COVID-19 pandemic, the Terrapins finished the 2020–21 season 17–14, 9–11 in Big Ten play to finish in a tie for eighth place. As the No. 8 seed in the Big Ten tournament, they beat Michigan State in the second round but lost to the No. 1-seeded Michigan in the quarterfinals. The Terrapins received an at-large bid to the NCAA tournament as the No. 10 seed in the East region. There they upset No. 7-seeded UConn in the first round, but lost to No. 2-seeded Alabama in the second round.

Offseason

Coaching changes
On April 16, 2021, two-year assistant coach DeAndre Haynes left to join Marquette new coach Shaka Smart as an assistant. On April 26, the school announced that it hired former Wake Forest head coach Manning as an assistant. On May 23, 11-year assistant coach Orlando Ranson left to join DePaul new coach Tony Stubblefield as an assistant. On June 5, the school announced former South Carolina assistant Bruce Shingler would replace Ranson.

On April 6, Director of Basketball Operations Mark Bialkoski announced he was leaving to become an assistant at East Tennessee State. On April 28, Turgeon announced Greg Manning Jr., the team's video coordinator for the three prior seasons, was named the new Director of Men's Basketball Operations.

Player departures

2021 recruiting class

Incoming transfers

Roster

Forward James Graham III left the team and entered the transfer portal on December 2, 2021.

Depth chart

Schedule and results

|-
!colspan=9 style=|Exhibition

|-
!colspan=9 style=| Regular season

|-
!colspan=9 style=|

Rankings

*AP does not release post-NCAA Tournament rankings^Coaches did not release a Week 1 poll.

References

Maryland Terrapins men's basketball seasons
Maryland
Maryland Terrapins Men's Basketball Team
Maryland Terrapins Men's Basketball Team